The Living Blood is a novel by writer Tananarive Due. It is the second book in Due's African Immortals Series. It is preceded by My Soul to Keep, which was published in 1997, and is followed by Blood Colony, which was published in 2008. It won the American Book Award in 2002.

References

2001 American novels
Novels by Tananarive Due
American horror novels
American science fiction novels
2001 science fiction novels
African-American novels